Muthu Sivalingam (20 July 1943 – 23 November 2022) was a Sri Lankan politician who was a member of the Parliament of Sri Lanka and a government minister.

Sivalingam died on 23 November 2022, at the age of 79.

References
 

1943 births
2022 deaths
Members of the 10th Parliament of Sri Lanka
Members of the 11th Parliament of Sri Lanka
Members of the 12th Parliament of Sri Lanka
Members of the 13th Parliament of Sri Lanka
Members of the 15th Parliament of Sri Lanka
Sri Lankan Hindus
Deputy ministers of Sri Lanka
Government ministers of Sri Lanka
United People's Freedom Alliance politicians
Ceylon Workers' Congress politicians